School District No. 37 (Delta) is a school district in British Columbia south of Vancouver. The district serves the Municipality of Delta including the three communities of Ladner, Tsawwassen, and North Delta.

Schools

References

See also
List of school districts in British Columbia

Education in Delta, British Columbia
37